The 1844 United States presidential election in Missouri took place between November 1 and December 4, 1844, as part of the 1844 United States presidential election. Voters chose seven representatives, or electors to the Electoral College, who voted for President and Vice President.

Missouri voted for the Democratic candidate, James K. Polk, over Whig candidate Henry Clay. Polk won Missouri by a margin of 13.96%.

Results

See also
 United States presidential elections in Missouri

References

Missouri
1844
1844 Missouri elections